Priene scabrum is a species of predatory sea snail, a marine gastropod mollusk in the family Ranellidae, the triton snails, triton shells or tritons.

Description

Distribution

References

Ranellidae
Gastropods described in 1832